Ani Jane Mugrditchian (born 11 May 1953) is a Lebanese former swimmer. She competed in the women's 100 metre breaststroke at the 1972 Summer Olympics. She was the first woman to represent Lebanon at the Olympics.

References

1953 births
Living people
Lebanese female swimmers
Olympic swimmers of Lebanon
Swimmers at the 1972 Summer Olympics
Place of birth missing (living people)
Female breaststroke swimmers